Sigrid Veasey is a physician and scientist affiliated with the University of Pennsylvania. She specializes in medicine.

Veasey is a professor at the Perelman School of Medicine at the University of Pennsylvania and the Center for Sleep and Circadian Neurobiology where she conducts research on sleep disorders and sleep disruption.

References

21st-century American scientists
Perelman School of Medicine at the University of Pennsylvania faculty
21st-century American physicians